Pnina Bor (November 30, 1924 – November 26, 2009) was an Israeli activist and the president of the B'nai B'rith Organization in Israel from 1986 until 1998, as well as a supervisor and a vice president of the B'nai B'rith World Organization.

Childhood
Pnina Bor was born November 30, 1924 to Zionist parents in the city of Tel Aviv.  Her father came to Palestine from Russia during the Second Aliya where he met Bor's mother, a third generation native. Bor studied at Le'Dugma Elementary School and Geula High School.  She also studied music, played the piano, and completed the Hebrew Conservatory in Tel Aviv. 

Bor joined the Haganah, and served in the armed forces until the establishment of the State of Israel.  She was recommended for a position in the Jewish Agency and became the secretary of Levi Eshkol, Israel's Prime Minister.  She was in charge of Israel's army recruitment because she had the skills that were needed to fulfill this important job.

B'nai B'rith
Bor was a member of the B'nai B'rith Organization and became one of its strongest leaders to date.  In 1965 she was elected president of the Miriam Ha'Nevia chapter in the city of Ramat Gan where she resided.  She received a prestigious award given to presidents of the organization called "Menorah".  She later went on to be the Chair of the Regional council in the Gush Dan area.  Bor led many committees in the organization including "The Committee for Israel, Culture and Tourism".  She was chosen to be Israel's representative in the B'nai B'rith International Council and the Council of Trustees, which are two of the most important committees in the B'nai B'rith Organization worldwide. 
 
Bor was subsequently elected to be the vice president and later on the national president of B'nai B'rith in Israel in 1986.  This was the first time that a woman was elected to serve in this role.  Bor was so successful that she was elected 3 consecutive times for a total of 12 years.  Under Bor's leadership, the B'nai B'rith Organization flourished and was intricately involved in Israeli life, establishing new lodges throughout the country. In addition, extensive fundraising took place from local and international donors strengthening the organization.  Bor became the supervisor of B'nai B'rith in Israel and eventually the global vice president for 8 years.

Contributions to other organizations
Bor volunteered throughout the years in different organizations such as:  Shalva Retirement Home where she served as a director; Aguda Le'Ma'an HaChayal as a council member; and Libi, which gives scholarships to victims of the IDF.  She was recommended by the Prime Minister to serve on a committee that grants awards to volunteers called "Ot Ha'Mitnadev".  This award is granted on behalf of the Ministry of Labour and Social Affairs and also on behalf of the President of Israel.
 
As busy as she was, Bor devoted a lot of energy to the city of Ramat Gan where she resided for almost 60 years.  Not only did she participate in various committees in the city, but she encouraged others to volunteer, encouraged tourism, and promoted initiatives to help the welfare of the city's residents.  She promoted causes such as: scholarships for needy children; setting up senior centers; supporting police officers; adopting families in need;  and supporting immigrant absorption centers to name a few. Her dedication to humanity was truly remarkable.

Recognition
Bor was highly regarded in Israel and abroad.  Throughout her lifetime she received many awards and honors including: "Yakirat Am Yafe, Am Echad"; "Yakirat Ramat Gan" (Ramat Gan, 1995); "Mother of the Year" (B'nai B'rith); "Menorah" (President's Organization); JNF Trees.
 
Bor was chosen to speak at conferences that were held in various religious institutions of all denominations to explain the political situation in Israel and abroad.  Not every community was sympathetic towards Israel but this never deterred her.  She was interviewed numerous times by the press, radio, and television.
 
Bor was awarded the "Mayors Degree" and given honorary citizenship from 15 cities in the United States.  She also received "The Mayor of San Antonio" award which was an honorary citizenship award with the Houston, Texas city key, and received a special certificate from the "Borough of Bronx", New York.  The National Jewish monthly, a B'nai B'rith publication, chose Bor as one of the 6 most active women in the organization worldwide.

Family life
Bor was married for almost 60 years to Abraham Bor, a master cellist, and member of the Israeli Philharmonic Orchestra. They are the parents of four children.

See also
 B'nai B'rith

1924 births
2009 deaths
B'nai B'rith
Israeli Jews
Israeli people of Russian-Jewish descent
Israeli women activists
Jews in Mandatory Palestine
People from Tel Aviv
Burials at Kiryat Shaul Cemetery